Legislative elections were held in Argentina on 6 March 1938. Voter turnout was 68%.

Results

Results by province

References

1938 elections in South America
1938 in Argentina
Elections in Argentina
Infamous Decade
March 1938 events